St George's Garrison Church is a ruined church in Woolwich in the Royal Borough of Greenwich, South East London. It was built in 1862-63 as a Church of England place of worship for the Woolwich Royal Artillery garrison. The church was hit by a V-1 flying bomb in 1944 and largely destroyed by fire. The restored ruin with its canopied roof, its blue, red and yellow brick walls, its mosaics and a memorial garden is open to the public on Sundays.

Location 
The church was built on a triangular plot between Grand Depot Road (part of the A205 or South Circular Road) and Woolwich New Road, its entrance facing the parade ground of the Royal Artillery Barracks on Grand Depot Road. It is surrounded by a small park. On the south side of this park, where the two roads converge, stands the Second Boer War memorial. Both the church and the memorial are part of Woolwich Common conservation area.

History

Construction and embellishment 
The first chapel for the Royal Artillery was part of the Royal Artillery Barracks complex at the north end of Woolwich Common. It was built in 1808 and after St George's was built it was converted into a theatre.

The idea for building a new garrison church came from Lord Sidney Herbert, the Secretary of State for War. The design of the church is similar to that of T.H. Wyatt's parish church in Wilton, close to the Herbert family seat at Wilton House. Lord Herbert no doubt influenced the choice of style and the architect. In Woolwich, Wyatt was assisted by his younger brother Matthew. The choice of the Wyatt brothers may also have been influenced by the fact that both the nearby Royal Artillery Barracks and the Royal Military Academy were designed by their forebear, James Wyatt. The Wyatt brothers designed a church in the Early Christian/Lombardic Romanesque style with Byzantine influences in the interior. The church was built by the Pimlico builders George Smith and Co.

Soon after completion, seating capacity was increased from 1,550 to 1,700. Royal Artillery officers raised money for stained-glass windows and a church organ. Further embellishments consisted of mosaics (1902–03) and various memorials for deceased artillery men. South of the church an obelisk was erected to the memory of those who fell in the Second Boer War.

Destruction, disrepair and conservation 
On 13 July 1944 a V-1 flying bomb hit the church and caused a fire which destroyed the interior. The walls were still more or less intact and a temporary roof was erected. The church however was no longer needed, as the smaller chapel of St Michael and All Angels at the Royal Military Academy proved to be a suitable replacement.

After the war the burned-out church suffered from further neglect and vandalism. In 1952 a rebuilding scheme proposed by the architect Kenneth Lindy failed to gain sufficient support. In 1970 the upper parts of the walls were demolished and a corrugated canopy roof was erected to cover the remainder of the apse. Photos from the 1960s show that the apse windows were still in place then, as well as the upper parts of the columns supporting the chancel arch and parts of the pulpit. Also in 1970, a memorial garden was laid out in the roofless nave and aisles. In 1973 the building was listed for its architectural merits, especially its polychromatic Victorian brick, as well as being part of an historic military ensemble and for demonstrating the impact of an aerial assault, reflected in its ruinous state.

In 2011 ownership of the site was transferred from Defence Infrastructure Organisation to Heritage of London Trust Operations. Shortly afterwards the Heritage Lottery Fund awarded a grant of just under £400,000, towards the total cost of £800,000, for much needed conservation work, including the building of a larger canopy roof over the east end of the church. Since 2016 the church has been run by a local group, the Woolwich Garrison Church Trust. Further plans entail restoration of the pulpit and reinstallment of alabaster panels in the apse, which have been kept in storage.

Architecture

Exterior 
The church's exterior mainly follows the style of the Romanesque Revival. The use of polychromatic brick is typical of the mid-Victorian period. The narthex at the west end was inspired by Romanesque churches in Northern Italy and consists of three porches with Bath stone columns and carved capitals. The two western columns of the central porch are quatrefoil-shaped and of Aberdeen granite. The original west façade had a rose window and was about four times higher than the remaining part of the narthex. The church was designed as a large basilica with a wide nave and narrow aisles, of which almost nothing remains. The church never had a tower, just a small belfry on the roof of the south aisle, looking slightly out of place. The lower parts of the apse and the east ends of the aisles are reasonably well-preserved.

Interior 
The interior of the church combines the neo-Romanesque and neo-Byzantine style. Most of it was lost in the fire or by neglect, but the lower parts of the chancel remain impressive. In the chancel various architectural details, mosaics (see below) and commemorative plaques are present, as well as the original altar and the lower part of the pulpit. Of the once impressive use of iron in the galleried interior almost nothing remains, except for two damaged corbels.

Mosaics 
The mosaics in the chancel were made in the Salviati workshop in Venice and installed by Burke & Co in 1902-03. The best-preserved panels show ancient Christian symbols such as vines with grapes, a peacock and a phoenix rising from the flames. A small mosaic of the Lamb of God was saved from the rubble and survives in one of the toilets in the north-west porch. The largest mosaic is a representation of Saint George and the Dragon in the apse. This is a slightly later addition of 1919-20, being part of a memorial to Royal Artillery men who had received the Victoria Cross.

Memorial site 
St George's has been a memorial church for more than a century. As well as the Victoria Cross memorial, several marble plaques commemorating artillery men survive in the apse. One of the columns supporting the arch that separates the chancel and the nave also bears the names of men killed in military conflict up till the Second World War.

A plaque inside the church commemorates the designation of the church as a memorial garden, following the V1 flying bomb destruction in July 1944.

The memorial garden was first laid out as a lawn in 1970. On the south and north aisle walls, copper plaques are attached with the names of Royal Artillery men killed in action or of natural causes after World War II. On 11 November 2015 a memorial was added by the Royal Borough of Greenwich marking Woolwich's history as a barracks town and commemorating the men and women who served or lived in Woolwich and gave their lives in the service of their country. Included are the names of the victims of the IRA-bombing of the King's Arms in 1974, and fusilier Lee Rigby, who was murdered by Islamic terrorists in Woolwich in 2013.

See also 
 Royal Artillery Barracks
 Woolwich Common – nearby conservation area
 St Peter's Roman Catholic Church, Woolwich – nearby listed church

Notes and references 
 , Woolwich through time, Amberley Publishing, 2014. 
 , Woolwich – Survey of London, Volume 48, Yale Books, London, 2012.  (online text chapter 7 ; please note page numbers online do not correspond with the book)

External links 

 
 St Georges Church Woolwich, London Tonight item on the restoration of the church, on YouTube

Royal Artillery
Churches in the Royal Borough of Greenwich
Churches completed in 1863
19th-century Church of England church buildings
Former churches in London
Church ruins in England
Woolwich
Grade II listed churches in London
Grade II listed buildings in the Royal Borough of Greenwich
Woolwich